This is the discography of American rapper Royce da 5'9" consists of 8 studio albums, 6 collaboration albums, 11 mixtapes and 30 solo singles, including 14 as a featured artist, and 18 music videos.

Albums

Studio albums

Compilation albums

Collaboration albums

EPs

Mixtapes

Singles

As lead artist

As featured artist

Guest appearances

Music videos

Production discography

See also 
 Bad Meets Evil discography
 Slaughterhouse discography

Notes

References 

Discographies of American artists
Hip hop discographies